Finger leather coral may refer to different coral taxa:

 species in the genus Cladiella , soft corals native to the Indo-Pacific region
 Finger leather coral Sinularia polydactyla